German submarine U-625 was a Type VIIC U-boat of Nazi Germany's Kriegsmarine during World War II. The submarine was laid down on 28 July 1941 at the Blohm & Voss yard in Hamburg, launched on 15 April 1942, and commissioned on 4 June 1942 under the command of Oberleutnant zur See Hans Benker.

After training with 8th U-boat Flotilla, U-625 was transferred to 3rd U-boat Flotilla for front-line service on 1 October 1942. She was soon transferred again, to 11th U-boat Flotilla on 1 November 1942, then again to 13th U-boat Flotilla on 1 June 1943, and finally to 1st U-boat Flotilla on 1 November 1943.

U-625 completed ten patrols, torpedoed three merchant ships, and sank two auxiliary warships with mines. The boat was sunk on 10 March 1944 off the west coast of Ireland by depth charges from a Canadian Sunderland patrol bomber EK591 "2U" from No. 422 Squadron RCAF.

Design
German Type VIIC submarines were preceded by the shorter Type VIIB submarines. U-625 had a displacement of  when at the surface and  while submerged. She had two shafts and two  propellers.

U-625 was fitted with five  torpedo tubes (four fitted at the bow and one at the stern), fourteen torpedoes, two twin-barrel anti-aircraft guns on the tower upper deck (double 2 cm FlaK 38 MII on double-LM43U mounts), and a single cannon on the lower wintergarten deck (3,7 cm automatic M42U on LM42U carriage). The boat had a complement of between forty-four and sixty.

Service history

First patrol
U-625 left Kiel on 1 October 1942 and sailed to Skjomenfjord, before commencing her first war patrol on 4 November. She sailed north to the waters south and east of Spitsbergen, where she sank three ships.

Her first victim was the 5,445 GRT British merchant ship . On 5 November the unescorted vessel had been bombed and damaged by a German Ju 88 aircraft of II./KG 30 (based at Banak, North Cape) and had beached at South Cape, Spitsbergen. The following day, 6 November, at 15:58, U-625 torpedoed the stranded vessel and then wrecked her with gunfire. The crew abandoned ship and landed on an isolated part of the island. They were not rescued until 4 January, by men from the garrison at Barentsburg. Only the master, three crewmen and nine gunners survived, while 36 crewmen members and nine gunners were lost, many to frostbite.

At 22:24 the same day, 6 November, she torpedoed and sank the unescorted 7,455 GRT British merchant ship Empire Sky south of Spitsbergen. The master and 40 crew members were lost.

On 23 November, at 00:56, U-625 torpedoed the 5,851 GRT British merchant ship Goolistan of Convoy QP-15, west of Bear Island. The U-boat hit the ship with another torpedo at 01:18, and she sank at 01:45. The master and 41 crewmen were lost.

U-625 arrived at Narvik on 29 November 1942 after 26 days at sea.

Second to fifth patrols
U-625'''s next four patrols in the waters north of Norway, between December 1942 and June 1943, were uneventful, and she had no successes.

Sixth patrolU-625 sailed from Trondheim on 12 July 1943, and headed north and then east into Soviet waters. On 20 July she laid mines in the Yugorsky Strait. On 25 July at 01:40, the 557 tons Soviet naval trawler T-904 (No. 58) struck a mine, which exploded under the boiler room, and sank the ship within two minutes. Ten of her crew of 45 were lost. The U-boat arrived in Narvik on 27 July after a 16-day patrol.

Seventh patrol
The U-boat returned to the Kara Sea to lay more mines, sailing from Hammerfest on 7 August, and returning to Narvik on the 20th. At 18:07 on 25 August the 572 tons Soviet Navy salvage vessel ASO-1 Shkval, struck two mines laid by U-625 in the Yugorsky Strait and sank immediately. Only five of her crew of 52 survived.

Eight and ninth patrols
Her next patrol from Trondheim, and lasting from 4 to 8 November, was uneventful. U-625 departed Trondheim again on 15 November 1943 and headed out into the northern Atlantic, south of Greenland. Having no success, she finally set a course for Brest, France. At 21:38 on 2 January 1944, in the Bay of Biscay, the U-boat was attacked by a Leigh light equipped British Liberator bomber from No. 224 Squadron RAF. U-625 opened fire with her AA guns and scored a hit, wounding the aircraft's radio operator. The U-boat then began to crash-dive. The commander Kapitänleutnant Hans Benker cancelled the order so that he and a crewman could recover the Naxos wire, but the boat continued to dive and Benker and the crewman were killed. The U-boat arrived at Brest on 6 January.

Tenth patrol and loss

The U-boat, now under the command of Oberleutnant zur See Siegfried Straub, left Brest on 29 February 1944 on her tenth and final patrol. On 10 March, west of Ireland, in position , she was sunk by depth charges from a Canadian Sunderland patrol bomber EK591 "2U" from No. 422 Squadron RCAF. All 53 hands were lost.
"The crew of the Canadian amphibious plane, the Sunderland, reported that it had sunk a German U-boat off the west coast of Ireland and that the crew were swimming around in the water. Pictures of the attack & sinking of U-625, and of some of the crew that escaped in liferafts (not all), were taken by the cameras aboard the Sunderland. The plane circled a few times and headed back to its home base. None of the submarine crew survived; before having a chance to be rescued, they were lost in high seas. Those pictures hung in the office of Sir Winston Churchill for a period during the war; it was the only confirmed proof of a U-boat "kill" by a Canadian coastal squadron during World War II. U-625 was one of 543 German ships that went lost together with its entire crew" (Neitzel & Welzer 2012:261, with two photos on p. 262 of U-625 being attacked and about half of the crew clustered together in the water in one-man rafts.)

Source: Neitzel, Sonke & Welzer, Harald 2012 Soldaten - On Fighting, Killing, and Dying: The Secret World War II Transcripts of German POWs. Translated from the German by Jefferson Chase. Scribe: Melbourne.

WolfpacksU-625'' took part in nine wolfpacks, namely:
 Boreas (19 – 28 November 1942) 
 Nordwind (24 January – 4 February 1943) 
 Eisbär (27 March – 15 April 1943) 
 Coronel (4 – 8 December 1943) 
 Coronel 1 (8 – 14 December 1943) 
 Coronel 2 (14 – 17 December 1943) 
 Föhr (18 – 23 December 1943) 
 Rügen 6 (23 – 28 December 1943) 
 Preussen (7 – 10 March 1944)

Summary of raiding history

References

Bibliography

External links

 Modelling U-625 scale model of U-boat

German Type VIIC submarines
U-boats commissioned in 1942
U-boats sunk in 1944
U-boats sunk by depth charges
U-boats sunk by Canadian aircraft
World War II submarines of Germany
World War II shipwrecks in the Atlantic Ocean
1942 ships
Ships built in Hamburg
Ships lost with all hands
Maritime incidents in March 1944